The County of Tatchera is one of the 37 counties of Victoria which are part of the cadastral divisions of Australia, used for land titles. It is located to the south of the Murray River, and to the south west of Swan Hill, with its western boundary at 143°E, and part of the southern boundary at 36°S.

Parishes 
Parishes include:
 Bael Bael, Victoria
 Benjeroop, Victoria
 Berriwillock, Victoria
 Boga, Victoria
 Boort, Victoria
 Budgerum East, Victoria
 Budgerum West, Victoria
 Burra, Victoria
 Cannie, Victoria
 Carapugna, Victoria
 Castle Donnington, Victoria
 Chillingollah, Victoria
 Chinangin, Victoria
 Coonimur, Victoria
 Cooroopajerrup, Victoria
 Dartagook, Victoria
 Gnarwee, Victoria
 Gredgwin, Victoria
 Jeruk, Victoria
 Kalpienung, Victoria
 Kaneira, Victoria
 Kooem, Victoria
 Koorangie, Victoria
 Koorkahb, Victoria
 Koro-Ganeit, Victoria
 Korrak Korrak, Victoria
 Kunat Kunat, Victoria
 Lalbert, Victoria
 Leaghur, Victoria
 Marmal, Victoria
 Meatian, Victoria
 Meering, Victoria
 Meering West, Victoria
 Meran, Victoria
 Mirkoo, Victoria
 Mumbel, Victoria
 Murnungin, Victoria
 Narrung, Victoria
 Ninveunook, Victoria
 Nowie, Victoria
 Nullawil, Victoria
 Nyrraby, Victoria
 Pental Island, Victoria
 Perrit Perrit, Victoria
 Piangil, Victoria
 Piangil West, Victoria
 Pines, Victoria
 Polisbet, Victoria
 Quambatook, Victoria
 Talgitcha, Victoria
 Tittybong, Victoria
 Toort, Victoria
 Towan, Victoria
 Towaninny, Victoria
 Turoar, Victoria
 Tyntynder, Victoria
 Tyntynder North, Victoria
 Tyntynder West, Victoria
 Ultima, Victoria
 Waitchie, Victoria
 Wakool, Victoria
 Wandown, Victoria
 Wangie, Victoria
 Wewin, Victoria
 Woorinen, Victoria
 Yungiera, Victoria

References
Vicnames, place name details
Research aids, Victoria 1910
	County of Tatchera,  Cadastral map showing county and parish boundaries, categories of lands holdings and reserves., 1880s. National Library of Australia

Counties of Victoria (Australia)